The event was being held for the first time since 1972.

Billy Martin and Russell Simpson won the title, defeating John Austin and Johan Kriek 6–3, 4–6, 6–4 in the final.

Seeds

  Sandy Mayer /  Frew McMillan (first round, withdrew)
  Tim Gullikson /  Bernard Mitton (first round)
  Jai DiLouie /  Robert Van't Hof (semifinals)
  Nick Saviano /  Bill Scanlon (semifinals)

Draw

Draw

External links
 Draw

1981 Grand Prix (tennis)
1981 Bristol Open